The first National March on Washington for Lesbian and Gay Rights was a large political rally that took place in Washington, D.C. on October 14, 1979. The first such march on Washington, it drew between 75,000 and 125,000 gay men, lesbians, bisexuals, transgender people, and straight allies to demand equal civil rights and urge the passage of protective civil rights legislation. Lesbian activist, comic and producer, Robin Tyler, emceed the main stage at the march.

History and Planning

The first major attempt at organizing a national gay and lesbian march on Washington occurred Thanksgiving Weekend 1973 in Urbana-Champaign, Illinois.  The National Gay Mobilizing Committee for a March on Washington (NGMC), organized by Jeff Graubart, attempted to coordinate a coalition of extant LGBT organizations to plan a March on Washington.  Early efforts were met with resistance from local and national LGBT organizations, and plans for a march were ultimately postponed.

The next organization attempt was to occur in Minneapolis the weekend of November 17–19, 1978. A steering committee was created to prepare for the Minneapolis conference, and it identified a primary goal of the march as transforming the gay movement from local to national.  However, the committee was dissolved in October 1978 due to internal dissent.  Harvey Milk, who had been on the Minneapolis steering committee, took up the reins to continue march organization, and had secured support from local DC groups who had previously dissented before he was assassinated by Dan White. Milk's assassination served as a catalyst and a touchstone for organizers, who next planned a conference in Philadelphia February 23–25, 1979.  One male and one female delegate was invited from known lesbian and gay organizations, and the attendees set forth to address three primary questions.  First, whether or not a march should take place.  Second, what the organizational structure of the march should be.  And third, the platform of the march.  An initial debate between marching in 1979 and 1980 sprung up, but 1979 was settled upon as it fell on the ten-year anniversary of the Stonewall Riots.  Once these issues were settled and issues of female and minority representation were handled, the conference set forth five demands that would serve as the platform for the march.  The participants chose to focus on single-issue politics so as not to dilute the message of a united lesbian and gay community.  The final organizational push occurred at a conference at the University of Houston campus July 6–8, 1979.

The National Steering Committee, with mandated gender parity and 25% representation of People of Color, was selected by community meetings throughout the country. Policy/Overview and Administrative Committees were established to guide the work and decisions between Steering Committee meetings. The National Office was set up in New York City with Joyce Hunter and Steven Ault as National Coordinators.

Platform

Joe Smenyak of New York City initially drafted Five Demands, later amended by the conference delegates.

Pass a comprehensive lesbian/gay rights bill in Congress
Issue a presidential executive order banning discrimination based on sexual orientation in the federal government, the military, and federally contracted private employment
Repeal all anti-lesbian/gay laws
End discrimination in lesbian-mother and gay-father custody cases
Protect lesbian and gay youth from any laws which are used to discriminate, oppress, and/or harass them in their homes, schools, jobs, and social environments

Activities and speakers

The march served to nationalize the gay movement, which had previously been focused on local struggles.  This spirit is invoked in the closing paragraph of the welcome program of the march, written by Allen Young.

"Today in the capital of America, we are all here, the almost liberated and the slightly repressed; the butch, the femme and everything in-between; the androgynous; the monogamous and the promiscuous; the masturbators and the fellators and the tribadists; men in dresses and women in neckties; those who bite and those who cuddle; celebates[sic] and pederasts; diesel dykes and nelly queens; amazons and size queens, Yellow, Black, Brown, White, and Red; the shorthaired and the long, the fat and the thin; the nude and the prude; the beauties and the beasts; the studs and the duds; the communes, the couples, and the singles; pubescents and the octogenarians. Yes, we are all here! We are everywhere! Welcome to the March on Washington for Lesbian and Gay Rights!"

The march began at 4th Street and the National Mall, turned left onto Pennsylvania Avenue, proceeded northwest towards the White House, turned left onto 15th Street, right onto E Street, left onto 17th Street and ended in a rally between the Washington Monument and the Reflecting Pool.  The march was led by the Salsa Soul Sisters, who carried the official march banner. It was also broadcast live on multiple National Public Radio affiliates throughout the US. Speakers and artists who spoke at the main rally included Harry Britt, Charlotte Bunch, Allen Ginsberg and Peter Orlovsky, Flo Kennedy, Morris Kight, Audre Lorde, Leonard Matlovich, Kate Millett, Troy Perry, Eleanor Smeal,First PFLAG President Adele Starr, and Congressman Ted Weiss.  
Mayor Marion Barry gave a welcome to the marchers on behalf of the city of Washington, DC. Activist, comic and producer, Robin Tyler, emceed and produced the main stage at the historic march. The author Alan Ginsberg read his poem, "Song," to the crowd. And Audre Lorde movingly declared from the stage, “Affirmation and work does not stop with this march on Washington. Each of us has a responsibility to take this struggle back to her and his community translated into daily action. Let us carry this solidarity that we are professing here today back with us into our everyday lives tomorrow and the day after and next week and next year. And let it be reflecting in a renewed commitment to a struggle for a future where we can all flourish, for not one of us will ever be free until we are all free.”

“When a heterosexual person shows a picture of his family, it’s called sharing. When we show a picture of our lover, it’s called flaunting. We want to share.”

Jok Church and Adam Ciesielski recorded a documentary vinyl LP of the main speeches at the event. The recording includes the voices of Robin Tyler, Steve Ault, Tom Robinson, Lucia Valeska, Allen Ginsberg, Arlie Scott, Richard Ashworth, Florynce Kennedy, Charles Law, Mary Watkins & Company, Kate Millet, Reverend Troy Perry, and people on the Gay Freedom Train. Adam Ciesielski is credited for the photos. The record was released by Magnus Records of Sacramento, California in association with Alternate Publishing. Houston LGBT History (.org) holds an online recording of the record.

In addition to the march itself, the organizers arranged three days of workshops featuring artistic events, strategy sessions, focus groups on specific issues of women and minorities within the LGBT community, consciousness raising, local organization, religion and other issues.  The Monday after the march was organized as a "Constituent Lobbying Day" in which over 500 participants attempted to contact every member of Congress to express support for gay-rights legislation.  The participants successfully met with fifty senators and more than 150 house members.

Organizations supporting the march included Lambda Legal Defense Fund, the National Coalition of Black Lesbians and Gays, the National Gay Task Force (who had withheld their endorsement until only a month prior to the march), and the National Organization for Women.

See also
 LGBT social movements
 Second National March on Washington for Lesbian and Gay Rights (1987)
 March on Washington for Lesbian, Gay and Bi Equal Rights and Liberation (1993)
 Millennium March on Washington (2000)
 National Equality March (2009)
 List of protest marches on Washington, D.C.
 National Pride March (2017)

References

1979 protests
October 1979 events in the United States
LGBT civil rights demonstrations
Protest marches in Washington, D.C.
LGBT events in Washington, D.C.
1979 in Washington, D.C.
Washington
LGBT rights in the United States
1979 in LGBT history
LGBT politics in the United States